Fritillaria meleagroides is a Eurasian species of flowering plant in the lily family Liliaceae, native to Xinjiang, Russia (Altay Krai, Western Siberia Krai, European Russia, North Caucasus), Kazakhstan, Ukraine, and Bulgaria.

Fritillaria meleagroides is a bulb-producing perennial up to 40 cm tall. The leaves are linear, alternate, up to 15 cm long. The flowers are nodding (hanging), bell-shaped, dark purple or brownish-purple.

References

External links
Шахматовидна ведрица, малка ведрица  Fritillaria meleagroides Patrin ex Schultes fil., Природозащитен статут. Критично застрашен description in Bulgarian, Bulgarian distribution map, color painting of Fritillaria meleagroides in bloom
Redbook Ukraine, Рябчик малый Fritillaria meleagroides Patrin ex Schult. et Schult.f. description in Ukrainian, Ukrainian distribution map, color photos of Fritillaria meleagroides in bloom
Pacific Bulb Society, Miscellaneous Fritillaria photos of several species including Fritillaria meleagroides

meleagroides
Flora of Eastern Europe
Flora of Asia
Plants described in 1829